Over 40 different Lutheran denominations currently exist in North America. However, most North American Lutherans belong to one of the three largest denominations, namely, the Evangelical Lutheran Church in America, the Lutheran Church–Missouri Synod, or the Wisconsin Evangelical Lutheran Synod.

Active denominations
Source:

 American Association of Lutheran Churches (AALC)
 Apostolic Lutheran Church of America (ALCA)
 Association of Confessional Lutheran Churches (ACLC)
 Association of Free Lutheran Congregations (AFLC)
 Augsburg Lutheran Churches (ALC)
 Canadian Association of Lutheran Congregations (CALC)
 Church of the Lutheran Brethren of America (CLBA)
 Church of the Lutheran Confession (CLC)
 Concordia Lutheran Conference (CLC)
 Conservative Lutheran Association (CLA)
 Eielsen Synod
 Estonian Evangelical Lutheran Church (EELK)
 Evangelical Lutheran Church - Eesti Synod (E.E.L.K.)
 Evangelical Lutheran Church in America (ELCA)
 Evangelical Lutheran Church in Canada (ELCIC)
 Evangelical Lutheran Conference & Ministerium of North America (ELCM)
 Evangelical Lutheran Diocese of North America (ELDoNA)
 Evangelical Lutheran Synod (ELS)
 General Lutheran Church (GLC)
 Illinois Lutheran Conference (ILC)
 Independent Lutheran Diocese (ILD)
 Laestadian Lutheran Church (LLC)
 Latvian Evangelical Lutheran Church in America (LELCA)
 Lutheran Church–Canada (LCC)
 Lutheran Church - International (LC-I)
 Lutheran Church–Missouri Synod (LCMS)
 Lutheran Churches of the Reformation (LCR)
 Lutheran Conference of Confessional Fellowship (LCCF)
 Lutheran Congregations in Mission for Christ (LCMC)
 Lutheran Orthodox Church (LOC)
 The Reformed Lutheran Church of America (RLCA)
 The Lutheran Evangelical Protestant Church (GCEPC)
 Lutheran Ministerium and Synod - USA (LMS-USA)
 North American Lutheran Church (NALC)
 Old Apostolic Lutheran Church
 Orthodox Lutheran Confessional Conference (OLCC)
 Protes'tant Conference
 United Lutheran Mission Association (ULMA)
 Wisconsin Evangelical Lutheran Synod (WELS)

Defunct denominations
Most of the now-defunct North American Lutheran denominations merged or were absorbed into larger bodies. The following is an incomplete list.

 American Evangelical Lutheran Church
 American Lutheran Church (The American Lutheran Church [1960-1987])
 American Lutheran Church (1930) (1930-1960)
 Anti-Missourian Brotherhood
 Association of Evangelical Lutheran Churches (A.E.L.C. 1978-1987)
 Augustana Catholic Church (ALCC)
 Augustana Evangelical Lutheran Church
 Augustana Orthodox & Evangelical Lutheran Synod
 Conference of the Norwegian-Danish Evangelical Lutheran Church of America
 Danish Evangelical Lutheran Church Association in America
 English Evangelical Lutheran Synod of Missouri and Other States
 English Evangelical Lutheran Synod of the Northwest
 Evangelical Lutheran Church of Canada
 Evangelical Lutheran Church (United States) (The Evangelical Lutheran Church)
 Evangelical Lutheran Concordia English Synod  (of Maryland, Virginia and West Virginia) 
 Evangelical Lutheran Federation (disbanded 1998)
 Evangelical Lutheran General Synod of the United States of America  (1820-1918)
 Evangelical Lutheran Joint Synod of Ohio (and Other States) (1818-1930)
 Evangelical Lutheran Synod of Maryland (1820-1918 / 1918-1962 / 1962-1987)
 Evangelical Lutheran Synod of Iowa  (XXXX-1930)
 Evangelical Lutheran Synodical Conference of North America 
 Evangelical Lutherans in Mission (1974-1978)
 Evangelical Lutheran Tennessee Synod
 Evangelical Synod of North America
 Fellowship of Lutheran Congregations
 Finnish Evangelical Lutheran Church of America
 General Council of the Evangelical Lutheran Church in North America  (1869-1918)
 Hauge Synod
 Icelandic Evangelical Lutheran Synod of America
 Lutheran Church in America (1962-1987)
 Lutheran Church in America - Canada Section (XXXX-1985)
 Lutheran Confessional Synod
 Lutheran Council in the United States of America (L.C.U.S.A.) (1962-1987)
 Lutheran Free Church (XXXX-1963)
 Lutheran Synod of Buffalo  (XXXX-1930)
 National Evangelical Lutheran Church
 National Lutheran Council (N.L.C.)
 Norwegian Augustana Synod
 Pennsylvania Ministerium (Ministerium of Pennsylvania) (1748-1918)
 Synod of the Norwegian Evangelical Lutheran Church in America
 Synod of Evangelical Lutheran Churches
 United Evangelical Lutheran Church
 United Lutheran Church in America (1918-1962)
 United Norwegian Lutheran Church of America
 United Synod of the Evangelical Lutheran Church in the South (1861-1918)

See also
 List of Lutheran denominations

References

Further reading
 Arand, Charles P, and Robert Kolb, eds. The Lutheran Confessions: History and Theology of the Book of Concord (2012)
 Bodensieck, Julius, ed. The encyclopedia of the Lutheran Church (3 vol 1965) vol 1 and 3 online free
 Brauer, James Leonard  and Fred L. Precht, eds. Lutheran Worship: History and Practice (1993)
 Brug, John F., Fredrich II, Edward C., Schuetze, Armin W.,  WELS and Other Lutherans. Milwaukee: Northwestern Publishing House, 1995. .
 Granquist, Mark. Lutherans in America: A New History (2015)
 Meyer,  Carl S.  Moving Frontiers: Readings in the History of the Lutheran Church Missouri Synod (1986)
 Roeber, A. G. Palatines, Liberty, and Property: German Lutherans in Colonial British America (1998)
 Wengert, Timothy J. and Mark Granquist, eds. Dictionary of Luther and the Lutheran Traditions (2017)
 Wiederaenders, Robert C., Historical Guide to Lutheran Church Bodies of North America, 2nd Edition Saint Louis: Lutheran Historical Conference, 1998.

External links
 A Little Lecture on Little Little-Known Lutheran Synods by Edward C. Fredrich
 Concordia Historical Institute: Department of Archives and History of the Lutheran Church–Missouri Synod

Lutheran